The Șoimuș is a left tributary of the river Valea Roșie in Romania. It flows into the Valea Roșie near Roșia.

References

Rivers of Romania
Rivers of Bihor County